William Yewdale Adams (August 6, 1927 – August 22, 2019) was an emeritus professor of anthropology at the University of Kentucky. He was the winner of the 1978 Herskovits Prize for his history of Nubia, Nubia: Corridor to Africa. In 2005 Adams was awarded the Order of the Two Niles, Sudan's highest civilian honor, for his contributions to Nubian history.

Early life
William Yewdale Adams was born in 1927 in Los Angeles, California, the second child of William Forbes Adams, an historian, and Lucy Mary née Wilcox Adams. His older brother was the philosopher Ernest Wilcox Adams. Following the death of his father in 1935, the family moved to Window Rock, Arizona where the widowed Lucy Adams took a position with the Bureau of Indian Affairs. These early years on the Navajo Reservation had a profoundly formative effect on the boy that led to a lifelong love of the American Southwest and an interest in other cultures.

Work
Adams's work in Nubia began in 1959 as part of the UNESCO archaeological salvage campaign to excavate sites threatened by the rising flood waters of Lake Nasser following the construction of the Aswan Dam. Over the course of the next seven years he excavated a number of medieval sites in northern Sudan, including the pottery factories at Faras. By analyzing the changing proportions of broken potsherds in the fill, Adams was able to establish a typology of Nubian pottery that could be used to date excavation levels.

References

American anthropologists
2019 deaths
1927 births
Academics from Los Angeles
People from Window Rock, Arizona
University of Kentucky faculty
Recipients of orders, decorations, and medals of Sudan